Witoszewo  (German Kunzendorf) is a village in the administrative district of Gmina Zalewo, within Iława County, Warmian-Masurian Voivodeship, in northern Poland.

The village has a population of 240.

References

Witoszewo